N. aurea  may refer to:
 Nausithoe aurea, a species of crown jellyfish found off the southeastern coast of Brazil
 Navia aurea, a plant species endemic to Venezuela
 Nectandra aurea, a plant species endemic to Venezuela

See also
 Aurea (disambiguation)